The Roßberg is a mountain, in the Black Forest immediately north of Breitnau in the German state of Baden-Württemberg. Hinterzarten, Titisee-Neustadt and St. Märgen are also nearby. On the same ridge just over 1 km to the west is the Hohwart (1123 m) and 2 km to the east, across the Oberbach valley, is the highest mountain in Breitnau municipality: the Weißtannenhöhe (1190 m).

On the northwestern side of the mountain the remains of a rampart and ditch system from the end of the 17th century may be made out. In the area of the Roßberg the fortifications (known as Schanzen) run from the Schanzenhäusle via the Ringelschanze to the zur Roßbergschanze.  Between the Ringelschanze and the Roßbergschanze there are continuous, linear structures with several triangular bastions. In 1690 battles were fought at Breitnau, but by the early 18th century the fortifications had lost their military significance.

Immediately next to the Roßbergschanze lies the Breitnau Friends of Nature house (Naturfreundehaus Breitnau).

References 

One-thousanders of Germany
Breisgau-Hochschwarzwald
Baden
Mountains and hills of the Black Forest